Mecate can refer to:
Mecate (rein)
Mecate (band)